The 2019 NBL1 season was the first season of NBL1 after the demise of the South East Australian Basketball League (SEABL). The season begun on 29 March 2019 with three matches being placed and it concluded on 17 August 2019 with the grand final of both the men's and women's seasons.

Background
On 15 February, the name of NBL1 was decided with Basketball Victoria and the NBL deciding on the name which would formerly replace the SEABL as the premier winter league. This was mainly due to the fact that Basketball Australia decided to pull the plug on the SEABL. Forcing the Victorian teams plus the three Tassie teams into the creation of the new league. Eltham Wildcats, Knox Raiders, Ringwood Hawks and the Waverley Falcons all got promoted from the Big V.

Teams

References

2019
2018–19 in Australian basketball
2019–20 in Australian basketball